Automotive pixel link, or APIX, is a serial high speed Gigabit Multichannel link to interconnect displays, cameras and control units over one single cable targeting automotive applications. APIX2 transmits up to two independent HR real time video channels plus bidirectional protected data communication with Ethernet, SPI, I2C including 8 channels for audio.

APIX, APIX2 and APIX3 were designed by Inova Semiconductors based in Munich, Germany.  Inova provides its own chips and licences the IP to other semiconductor suppliers such as Fujitsu, Toshiba, Analog Devices, Cypress, and Socionext.

Popularity 
The standard is used by a growing number of car OEMs especially in the infotainment area.

It was licensed in 2008 by Fujitsu for use in their automotive controllers. There are also Commercial off-the-shelf boards available from e.g.
Congatec. There are also implementations as IP block for Xilinx FPGAs.

Specifications 

APIX (or APIX1), which is on lifetime buy through the end of 2019, allows for:
 Two- or Four-Wire Full Duplex Link
 Up to 1 GBit/s Downstream Link
 Up to 62.5 MBit/s max Upstream Link
 Low EMI
 Wide spread spectrum pixel clock
 More than 15 m distance with low profile STP cables
 10/12/18/24 bit pixel Interface

APIX2  allows for higher link speeds and more flexibility:
 it can mix various data streams, including SPI, I2C or Ethernet
 500 Mbit/s, 1 Gbit/s and 3 Gbit/s sustained downstream link bandwidth
 187.5 Mbit/s upstream link bandwidth
 Single/dual channel LVDS 18 or 24 bit
 Video resolution up to 1280x720x24bit (720p) / 2 x 1280x720x18 bit / 1600x600x24 bit @ 60 Hz

APIX3  adds higher link speeds:
 support STP (shielded twisted pair) QTP (quad twisted pair) and co-axial
 link bandwidth of 6 Gbit/s over STP and 12Gbit/s over QTP
 Video resolution up to HD and Ultra HD

Notes

Digital display connectors